In the context of transit in New York state, the Yellow Line may refer to:

 Any New York City Subway service that uses the BMT Broadway Line and its branches:
 N Broadway Express
 Q Broadway Express
 R Broadway Local
 W Broadway Local
 The Central Terminal Circulator route of the AirTrain JFK
 The Hempstead Branch of the Long Island Rail Road